
Gmina Nieporęt is a rural gmina (administrative district) in Legionowo County, Masovian Voivodeship, in east-central Poland.

Villages
Gmina Nieporęt contains the villages and settlements of Aleksandrów, Beniaminów, Białobrzegi, Izabelin, Józefów, Kąty Węgierskie, Michałów-Grabina, Nieporęt, Rembelszczyzna, Rynia, Stanisławów Drugi, Stanisławów Pierwszy, Wola Aleksandra, Wólka Radzymińska and Zegrze Południowe.

Neighbouring gminas
Gmina Nieporęt is bordered by Warsaw, by the towns of Legionowo and Marki, and by the gminas of Jabłonna, Radzymin, Serock and Wieliszew.

References

Polish official population figures 2006

Nieporet
Legionowo County